Călin Andrei Zanc (21 August 1971 – 10 September 2014) was a Romanian footballer who played as a defender. He died at age 43 in a road accident, after the driver of the car he was on lost control of the vehicle and crashed into a fence in Jichișu de Jos.

Honours
Universitatea Cluj
Divizia B: 1991–92
Cetate Deva
Divizia C: 1999–2000
Rocar București
Cupa României runner-up: 2000–01
AEK București
Divizia B: 2001–02

Notes

References

External links
Călin Zanc manager profile at Labtof.ro

1971 births
2014 deaths
Romanian footballers
Association football defenders
Liga I players
Liga II players
AFC Rocar București players
CS Corvinul Hunedoara players
FC Politehnica Timișoara players
CSM Deva players
FC Sportul Studențesc București players
FC Universitatea Cluj players
Road incident deaths in Romania
People from Dej
Romanian football managers
FC Politehnica Timișoara managers
FC Unirea Dej players